Golden Soak is a 1973 thriller novel by the British writer Hammond Innes. It was adapted into a 1979 Australian television series of the same title.

With his Cornish mining business struggling, a man fakes his own death and heads out to Australia where he becomes mixed up with intrigue concerning huge copper deposits in the Gibson Desert.

References

Bibliography
 James Vinson & D. L. Kirkpatrick. Contemporary Novelists. St. James Press, 1986.

1973 British novels
Novels by Hammond Innes
British thriller novels
Novels set in Cornwall
Novels set in Australia
British novels adapted into television shows
William Collins, Sons books